The 2014–15 Alabama–Huntsville Chargers ice hockey team represented the University of Alabama in Huntsville in the 2014–15 NCAA Division I men's ice hockey season. The Chargers were coached by Mike Corbett who was in his second season as head coach. His assistant coaches were Gavin Morgan and Matty Thomas. The Chargers played their home games in the Propst Arena at the Von Braun Center and competed in the Western Collegiate Hockey Association.

UAH finished the season with 8 wins, 24 losses, and 4 ties, exceeding their win total of the previous three seasons combined.  In conference play, the Chargers finished with a record of 7 wins, 20 losses, and 1 tie, placing 8th in the 10-team league.  The team participated in the WCHA Tournament for the first time, after missing the playoffs in the previous season.  The Chargers lost the 2-game series to second-seeded Michigan Tech, despite a 76-save performance in triple overtime from goaltender Carmine Guerriero in Game 1.  Freshman Max McHugh was named to the WCHA's All-Rookie team.

Recruiting
UAH added 8 freshmen for the 2014–15 season, including 1 goaltender, 4 forwards, and 3 defensemen.  In addition, Alex Carpenter, who transferred from Western Michigan following the 2012–13 season, will be eligible after sitting out one season.

Roster

Departures from 2013–14 team
Alex Allan, F, Graduated – signed with the Brampton Beast (ECHL)
Joakim Broberg, F – transferred to St. Thomas (MN) (MIAC (D-III))
Brandon Clowes, F – transferred to Lethbridge (CIS)
C. J. Groh, G, Graduated
Brice Geoffrion, F, Graduated
Mat Hagen, D, Graduated
Stephen Hickey, D
Jamie Kendra, F – transferred to Brock (CIS)
Steve Koshey, D
Stephen McKenna, F
Wade Schools, D – transferred to American International (AHA)

2014–15 team
As of October 13, 2014

|}

Schedule and results
  Green background indicates win.
  Red background indicates loss.
  Yellow background indicates tie.

|-
!colspan=12 style=""| Regular Season

|-
!colspan=12 style=""| WCHA Tournament

Standings

Player stats
As of March 14, 2015

Skaters

Goaltenders

References

Alabama–Huntsville Chargers men's ice hockey seasons
Alabama Huntsville